The 2013–14 Borussia Dortmund season was the 105th season in the club's football history. In 2013–14, the club played in the Bundesliga, the top tier of German football. It was the club's 38th consecutive season in this league, having been promoted from the 2. Bundesliga in 1976.

Players

First team squad

Competitions

Overall

Pre-season and friendlies

Competitions

Bundesliga

League table

Results summary

Results by round

Matches

DFB-Pokal

Last updated: 16 April 2014
Sources: DFB.de, kicker.de

DFL-Supercup

Last updated: 27 July 2013
Source: Bundesliga.de

UEFA Champions League

Group stage

Knockout phase

Round of 16

Quarter-finals

Team statistics

Squad information

Squad and statistics

Squad, appearances and goals

|-
! colspan="14"| Sources
|-
! colspan="14"| Last updated: 17 May 2014
|}

Goalscorers

All competitions

Bundesliga

DFB-Pokal

Champions League

DFL-Supercup

Disciplinary record

Bookings

Suspensions

Transfers

In

Out

References

Borussia Dortmund seasons
Borussia Dortmund season 2013-14
Borussia Dortmund